Shohrat Order, translated as Order of Glory, is an award presented by the President of the Republic of Azerbaijan.

History and status
The order was created by the Decree No. 757 of the President of Azerbaijan, Heydar Aliyev and ratified by National Assembly of Azerbaijan on December 6, 1993. The Shohrat Order is given to the citizens of Republic of Azerbaijan, foreign nationals and non-citizens for the following services:
special contributions to the economic, scientific, socio and cultural development;
special contributions to establishing and strengthening of peace and friendships among and development of cooperation between peoples;
services yielding extraordinary and professional results in the industrial, transportation, communications, construction fields as well as in other spheres of economic activity;
special contributions in science, education and health sector.

The order is pinned to the left side of the chest. If there are any other orders or medals, the Shohrat Order follows Sheref Order (Order of Pride).

Description
Shohrat order is in the form of horizontal crescent, with composition of national ornaments supplemented within the laurus branches with leaves and sun with un upward-shining rays. The composition is made of silver colored with gold, attached to a blue-white colored ribbon bar with five edges. Across the upward rays runs a rainbow-shaped golden belt connecting the tips of laurus branches and reading the word Şöhrət (Glory).
The rear side of the order is polished and has an engraved order number.

Previous versions
The original version of the order was in gold, on a medal with an eight-edged star and national ornaments with red and green colors. On the foreground, there were golden laurus branches surrounding a colored bird figure. The upper part of the medal included an eight-pointed star. The lower part had a rainbow-shaped ribbon reading Şöhrət. The order was revised on February 6, 1998 to the current version.

Recipients 

Chingiz Abdullayev, Azerbaijani writer, novelist
Safar Abiyev, former Minister of Defense of Azerbaijan Republic
Vasif Adigozalov, Azerbaijani composer
Franghiz Ahmadova, opera singer
 Elmira Akhundova, Azerbaijani writer and politician
Telman Aliev, Azerbaijani academician
Natig Aliyev, Minister of Industry and Energy of Azerbaijan Republic
Ramiz Asker, PhD, thinker, linguist, writer, translator, educator.
Nizami Bahmanov (posthumously), former MP, Head of Shusha Rayon executive power.
Akif Jafar Hajiyev, Azerbaijani mathematician
Aga-bala Hajiyev, Head of the Office of the Cabinet of Ministers of the Republic of Azerbaijan since 2003.
Zarosh Hamzayeva, Azerbaijani actress
Faiq Hasanov, Azerbaijani chess player
Zakir Hasanov, Minister of Defence of Azerbaijan since 2013.
Südaba Hesenova, Azerbaijani magistrate, former Minister of Justice and 2nd President of the Supreme Court.
Mansum Ibrahimov, Azerbaijani mugam musician
Nazim Ismayilov, Director of Azerbaijan National Agency for Mine Action (ANAMA) 
Tukezban Ismayilova, Azerbaijani singer, khananda
Roza Jalilova, Azerbaijani dancer
Yavar Jamalov, Minister of Defence Industry of Azerbaijan
Shamsaddin Khanbabayev, MP, Head of Khachmaz Rayon executive power.
Nizami Khudiyev, MP, former Executive Director of AzTV
Hüseyin Kıvrıkoğlu, Chief of Chief of General Staff of Turkish Armed Forces
Joseph Kobzon, Russian singer.
Novruz Mammadov, Azerbaijani academician
Fikrat Mammadov, Azerbaijani politician
Yashar Nuri, Azerbaijani actor
Hidayat Orujov, Azerbaijani writer and former Chairman of the State Committee for Work with Religious Organizations of Azerbaijan Republic
Fazila Samadova, Azerbaijani chemist
Firangiz Sharifova, Azerbaijani actress
Elmira Süleymanova, Azerbaijani chemist and incumbent Ombudsman.
Zalimkhan Yagub (twice), Azerbaijani poet
Khumar Zulfugarova, Azerbaijani dancer, choreographer
Alexander (Ishein), Archbishop of Baku and Azerbaijan from 1999 to 2021

References 

Orders, decorations, and medals of Azerbaijan
Awards established in 1993
1993 establishments in Azerbaijan